Drilonematidae is a family of nematodes belonging to the order Spirurida.

Genera

Genera:
 Adieronema Timm, 1967
 Alaninema Théodoridès, 1957
 Araguanema Ivanova & Hope, 2004

References

Nematodes